(born 15 May 1976 in Ústí nad Labem) is a triathlete from the Czech Republic.

Ospalý competed at the first Olympic triathlon at the 2000 Summer Olympics.  He did not finish the competition.

He competed again four years later, at the 2004 Summer Olympics.  This time, Ospalý finished.  His time of 1:57:17.58 placed him twenty-ninth.

Ospalý became European Champion during the 2006 ITU Duathlon European Championship in Rimini.

He is part of ECS Triathlon club.

References

External links
 www.ospaly.cz

Czech male triathletes
Olympic triathletes of the Czech Republic
Triathletes at the 2000 Summer Olympics
Triathletes at the 2004 Summer Olympics
1976 births
Living people
Triathletes at the 2008 Summer Olympics
Duathletes
Sportspeople from Ústí nad Labem